Danger on Midnight River is the sixth novel in the World of Adventure series by Gary Paulsen. It was published on July 1, 1995 by Random House.

Plot
The story is about Daniel Martin who gets made fun of a lot because he isn't the brightest kid in school. But when he and his classmates get stranded in the wilderness, Daniel saves the day.

Publication
It was later turned into a two part omnibus along with Grizzly by Macmillan and released in February, 1999. Also on February 14, 2006 it was turned into a three part omnibus along with Escape from Fire Mountain and Hook 'Em Snotty! by Random House.

References

Novels by Gary Paulsen
1995 American novels
American young adult novels
American adventure novels
Novels about survival skills